Prays peregrina is a moth of the family Plutellidae. It was first discovered in North London in 2003, and subsequently in the Chelsea Physic Garden, West London in 2005. Since then there have been a number of records in the London and Kent area. Although it is only known from Great Britain, the species is thought to be native to Asia and was imported with food or plants from that region.

The wingspan is about 14 mm.

Leafmining caterpillars of this species were found on Ruta chalpensis in October 2016 in Bishops Stortford, Hertfordshire.

Etymology
The species epithet is from the Latin peregrina, meaning "that comes from foreign parts".

External links
Fauna Europaea
Mystery moth, Prays peregrina, makes Britain its home
UKmoths

Notes

Plutellidae
Moths described in 2007